Sebastián Coates Nion (born 7 October 1990), often known as Seba Coates is a Uruguayan professional footballer who plays as a centre back. He captains Portuguese club Sporting CP and plays for the Uruguay national team.

Having begun his career at Nacional, where he was a regular from his debut in 2009, Coates joined Liverpool in 2011. He spent time out on loan, back at Nacional, and at Sunderland, and then joined the latter permanently in 2015. In January 2016, he moved to Sporting, initially on loan before signing permanently in February 2017. Following his move, Coates became an important member of the Sporting squad, captaining the side, and leading the club to a number of trophies, including the club's first league title in 19 years during the 2020–21 season.

Coates made his international debut at the 2011 Copa América, and was voted Young Player of the Tournament after Uruguay won the final. He also represented the country at the 2012 Olympics, the FIFA World Cup in 2014, 2018 and 2022, and the Copa América in 2015 and 2019.

Early life
Coates was born in Montevideo. On his paternal side, he is of Scottish ancestry, although his family does not speak English.

Club career

Nacional
Coates joined Nacional at 11, and worked his way up through the age groups, appearing as captain at every level. In 2009, aged 18, he signed a contract and began playing for the first team. His first appearance came against Bella Vista, a performance for which he was named man of the match by Uruguay's El País. He subsequently started every game for Nacional, notwithstanding suspension and national duty.

Liverpool

In August 2011, Coates was the subject of substantial interest from Premier League club Liverpool. He was given permission to have a medical at Melwood ahead of his proposed move on 26 August, and the following day watched Liverpool's match against Bolton Wanderers. On 30 August, after receiving a work permit, Liverpool announced that they had signed Coates on "a long-term contract" for an undisclosed fee, reported to be around £7 million.

On 18 September, Coates made his debut for Liverpool against Tottenham Hotspur, replacing the injured Daniel Agger in the 27th minute, in a 4–0 defeat. Coates went on to make his first start for the club on 21 September against Brighton & Hove Albion in the League Cup. Liverpool won the match 2–1 and Coates started the next match in this competition against Stoke City which Liverpool also won 2–1. Liverpool progressed through all stages to win the tournament resulting in Coates winning his first medal as a Liverpool player. On 21 March 2012, he scored his first goal for Liverpool against Queens Park Rangers, with a scissor kick from the edge of the box in the 3–2 loss at Loftus Road.

Coates suffered a knee injury playing for Uruguay in a friendly match against Japan in August 2013. The injury sidelined the player for much of the 2013–14 season. The second half of the season saw Coates return to Nacional on loan, helping him to secure a place in Uruguay's World Cup team.

Sunderland

On 1 September 2014, Coates was loaned out to fellow Premier League side Sunderland on a season-long loan, joining up with fellow Uruguayan manager Gus Poyet. He made his debut as a starter on the 23rd in the third round of the League Cup, against Stoke City at the Stadium of Light. At half-time, he was substituted for Patrick van Aanholt and Sunderland lost 1–2. His first league match of his loan was on 3 December, playing the entirety of a 1–4 home defeat against Manchester City. Coates had to fill in at left back in the Tyne-Wear derby against Newcastle on 21 December after Anthony Réveillère suffered an injury in the warm up, but coped well as Sunderland won 1–0. However, after Sunderland were beaten 1–3 by Hull in the next game, Coates fell out of favour and failed to make another Premier League start under Poyet. After the manager was sacked and replaced by Dick Advocaat, Coates became more involved. He played every minute of Sunderland's run of five unbeaten games that kept them from relegation with a game to spare.

On 1 July 2015, Sunderland announced that they had signed Coates on a permanent four-year deal for an undisclosed fee reported to be in the region of £2 million. He scored an own goal on 1 November as the team lost 6–2 away to Everton.

Sporting CP
On 28 January 2016, Coates signed for Sporting CP on loan until the end of the season, as new Black Cats manager Sam Allardyce sought to balance the books. He made his debut on 8 February in a goalless home draw with Rio Ave, and totalled 13 matches (all starts) over the season as the Lisbon-based club came second. On 10 May, his loan was extended for the following campaign.

On the first day of the 2016–17 season, at home to Marítimo, Coates scored his first goal for the Leões to open a 2–0 win by heading in João Mário's corner kick.

He joined Sporting on a permanent basis on 2 February 2017.

In the Taça da Liga final on 26 January 2019, Coates missed his spot-kick but Sporting prevailed over FC Porto 3–1 in the penalty shoot-out to win their second straight league cup title. Four months later in the final of the Taça de Portugal on 25 May, Sporting and Porto again required a penalty shoot-out to determine the winner after the match ended 2–2; Coates converted his kick to help Sporting to a 5–4 win.

On 31 August 2019, Coates conceded three penalties and was sent off as Sporting fell 2–3 to Rio Ave. All three fouls were against Iranian forward Mehdi Taremi.

Coates captained and was a key player for the side that won the 2020–21 Primeira Liga, the club's first league title in 19 years. He was praised for leading a back-line that kept 20 clean sheets and only conceded 20 goals in 34 matches, being awarded as the 2020-21 Primeira Liga's best player.

International career

After playing for the Uruguay under-20s he was called up for Uruguay's first leg match in the CONMEBOL–CONCACAF playoff against Costa Rica in qualification for the 2010 FIFA World Cup, where he was an unused substitute.

He made his full international debut against Chile in the 2011 Copa América second group match, playing the full 90 minutes of a 1–1 draw at the Estadio Malvinas Argentinas in Mendoza, Argentina. He played the remainder of the tournament, apart from being suspended for their quarter-final win over the hosts, and Coates went on to win the award for the Best Young Player at the end of the tournament, and his nation won the competition.

He was called up by Óscar Tabárez for the Uruguay Olympic football team that played at the 2012 Summer Olympics which were held in London. He played every minute of their campaign, however Uruguay ultimately failed to qualify for the knockout round. At the 2013 FIFA Confederations Cup in Brazil, he made one brief substitute appearance in a 2–1 victory against Nigeria and a start in an 8–0 win against Tahiti in the group, as Uruguay finished the tournament in fourth place.

Although injury saw Coates miss out the entire Premier League season, he made a full recovery in time to be selected in the final 23-man squad for the 2014 FIFA World Cup. He made one appearance as the side reached the last 16, playing two minutes as a substitute for his Liverpool teammate Luis Suárez in the 2–1 group stage victory over England. The following year at the 2015 Copa América in Chile, Coates played Uruguay's final group match, a 1–1 draw against Paraguay, due to the suspension of captain Diego Godín; Uruguay were eliminated in the quarter-finals by the hosts.

In May 2018, he was named in Uruguay's 23 man squad for the 2018 World Cup in Russia.

Career statistics

Club

International

Scores and results list Uruguay's goal tally first.

Honours
Nacional
Primera División Uruguaya: 2009, 2011

Sporting CP
Primeira Liga: 2020–21
Taça de Portugal: 2018–19
Taça da Liga: 2017–18, 2018–19, 2020–21, 2021–22
Supertaça Cândido de Oliveira: 2021
Uruguay
Copa América: 2011
Individual
Copa América Best Young Player: 2011
SJPF Primeira Liga Team of the Year: 2016, 2017
LPFP Primeira Liga Player of the Year: 2020-21
Sporting CP Player of the Year: 2020
Primeira Liga Team of the Year: 2020–21

References

External links

Profile at the Sporting CP website

Living people
1990 births
2011 Copa América players
Footballers at the 2012 Summer Olympics
2013 FIFA Confederations Cup players
2014 FIFA World Cup players
2015 Copa América players
2018 FIFA World Cup players
2019 Copa América players
2022 FIFA World Cup players
Copa América-winning players
Association football central defenders
Club Nacional de Football players
Liverpool F.C. players
Sunderland A.F.C. players
Sporting CP footballers
Olympic footballers of Uruguay
Uruguayan Primera División players
Premier League players
Primeira Liga players
Footballers from Montevideo
Uruguay international footballers
Uruguay under-20 international footballers
Expatriate footballers in England
Expatriate footballers in Portugal
Uruguayan expatriate footballers
Uruguayan expatriate sportspeople in England
Uruguayan expatriate sportspeople in Portugal
Uruguayan footballers
Uruguayan people of Scottish descent